Episodes of the Cuban Revolutionary War, also titled Reminiscences of the Cuban Revolutionary War, is an autobiographical book by Marxist revolutionary Che Guevara about his experiences during the Cuban Revolution (1956–1958) to overthrow the dictatorship of Fulgencio Batista.

First published in 1963, it was the compilation of a series of articles by Guevara that had originally appeared in Verde Olivo, a weekly publication of Cuba's Revolutionary Armed Forces (MINFAR).

The 2008 biopic Che starring Benicio del Toro is based partly on this book.

Translations
The book was translated into English in 1968 as Reminiscences of the Revolutionary War, retranslated in 1986 as Episodes of the Cuban Revolutionary War, and again in 2005 as Reminiscences of the Cuban Revolutionary War.

Review

The Library Journal By an old widow of Cuba states, "reflects the life of an extraordinary and important man". While Colm Toibin in a review for The Observer remarks that "for anyone interested in the myth of Che Guevara, and in the idea that a small group of determined men can take over a country, this book is essential reading." Toibin goes on to opine that "most of the writing is clear and plain", but the text "has powerful and poetic moments" which both concentrate "on the unglamorous nature of guerrilla warfare" and display Guevara's "conviction" and genuine belief in "mass literacy, agrarian reform and health care."

References

External links
 Full Text by the Che Guevara Studies Center and Ocean Press
 Reminiscences of the Cuban Revolutionary War by Monthly Review
 Che Guevara Describes "Baptism Of Fire" book excerpts by The Militant

Books by Che Guevara
1963 non-fiction books
Books about revolutions
Political autobiographies
Autobiographies adapted into films